Bauhinia pichinchensis is a species of plant in the family Fabaceae. It grows as a tree reaching 10 m in height. It is found only in Ecuador. Its natural habitats are subtropical or tropical moist lowland forests and subtropical or tropical moist montane forests.

References

 Wunderlin, Richard P. "Three New Species of Bauhinia (Fabaceae) from Ecuador." Brittonia 35, no. 4 (1983): 335–340.

pichinchensis
Flora of Ecuador
Vulnerable plants
Taxonomy articles created by Polbot